Post Ridge is a rock ridge, 3 nautical miles (6 km) long and trending WNW-ESE, situated immediately northeast of Mount Swan in the Ford Ranges, Marie Byrd Land. Discovered and first mapped by the United States Antarctic Service (USAS), 1939–41. Named by Advisory Committee on Antarctic Names (US-ACAN) for Madison J. Post, ionospheric physicist at Byrd Station in 1970.

Ridges of Marie Byrd Land